Breaking the Taboo is the twentieth studio album by Japanese heavy metal band Loudness. It was released in 2006 only in Japan.

Track listing
Music by Akira Takasaki, lyrics by Minoru Niihara

"Breaking the Taboo" - 4:28
"Brutal Torture" - 4:54
"Sick World" - 4:52
"Don't Spam Me" - 3:56
"Damnation" - 5:19
"The Love of My Life" - 4:32
"A Moment of Revelation" - 5:34
"Dynamite" - 4:49
"Risk Taker" - 4:16
"I Wish" - 5:51
"Diving into Darkness" - 4:13
"Without You" - 4:05

Personnel
Loudness
Minoru Niihara - vocals
Akira Takasaki - guitars
Masayoshi Yamashita - bass
Munetaka Higuchi - drums

Production
Masayuki Nomura - engineer, mixing
Shin Takakuwa, Takayuki Ichikawa - engineers
Takaaki Abiko - mixing assistant
Fumiaki Nochi - mastering
Hirose Shiraishi, Shinji Hamasaki - supervisors
 Kiyomasa Shinoki, Michiko Fujita, Shun Ooki - executive producers

References

2006 albums
Loudness (band) albums
Japanese-language albums
Tokuma Shoten albums